John Giles (born 9 February 1927) is a British former shotputter who competed in the 1948 Summer Olympics and in the 1952 Summer Olympics. He was born in Edmonton, London.

References

  

1927 births
Possibly living people
British male shot putters
English male shot putters
Olympic athletes of Great Britain
Athletes (track and field) at the 1948 Summer Olympics
Athletes (track and field) at the 1952 Summer Olympics
People from Edmonton, London
Athletes from London